The Piano Sonata No. 13 in B-flat major, K. 333 / 315c, was composed by Wolfgang Amadeus Mozart in Linz at the end of 1783.

Dating
There is no doubt the sonata was first published on 21 April 1784 in Vienna by Christoph Torricella (along with K. 284 and K. 454, as op. 7). The actual date of composition, however, has proven more difficult to determine. Because the manuscript is not written on the type of music paper Mozart is known to have used in Vienna, scholars believed the piece was composed before Mozart moved to said city. Thus Köchel, in the first edition of his Mozart catalog (1862), gave the hypothetical date 1779, later clarified by Georges de Saint-Foix (1936) to "Salzburg, beginning of January–March 1779." However, Alfred Einstein, in the third edition of the Köchel catalog (1937), said it was composed in "late summer 1778 in Paris." This date was maintained even until the sixth edition of the Köchel catalog (1964).

More recently, this date has been invalidated by the findings of Wolfgang Plath and Alan Tyson. On the basis of Mozart's script, Plath assigns the piece to the time around 1783/84, "likely not long before the appearance of the first print." Furthermore, Tyson convincingly demonstrates through paper tests that the work was composed at the end of 1783, likely in November, around the same time as the "Linz Symphony", K. 425, when the Mozart couple made a stopover in Linz on their way back to Vienna from Salzburg. This new dating also fits stylistic criteria.

Movements

The work is a sonata in three movements:

A typical performance takes about 23 minutes.

I. Allegro

The first movement is in sonata form and is generally lively in character. It begins in the key of B major and eventually cadences on the dominant, F major. The development section starts in F major and modulates through several keys before recapitulating on the tonic.

II. Andante cantabile

The second movement is marked Andante cantabile and is also in sonata form, but in the subdominant key of E major. The movement opens with thirds in the right hand progressing to the more lyrical theme of the movement accompanied by flowing broken triads in the left hand. It soon modulates to B major for a minuet-like section. After this, the movement begins to modulate back to E major for a repeat of the exposition. However, after the first repeat, just as it seems to settle again in E major, the development part begins in F minor. Then, it modulates to C minor, to A major, to F minor, then D minor, and finally back to the tonic, E major at which point the recapitulation occurs. Throughout the second movement, chromaticism is present which occasionally evokes a slight sense of dissonance.

III. Allegretto grazioso

The third movement, a sonata-rondo, shows much similarity to the first by chord pattern and by music phrases. The first part starts simply but playfully.  The theme is repeated but with the broken chords accompanying the melody. The mood slowly softens but a difficult melody is quickly established. It builds up and ends at a climax.

In the second part the first part is repeated until its course changes to a minor key.  It then plays two phrases which will be repeated in different keys.
The third part comes in quickly and unexpectedly.  It comes to a section where the major and minor keys switch every few bars.  It slowly comes back to the major key where it repeats the opening theme for the second time.
It continues with phrases adapted from the first movement. Then comes a series of arpeggios which lead to a short pause preceding the final repeat of the first theme with accompaniment variations, ending the piece.

References in pop culture 

The first movement was performed at the Royal Albert Hall in 1969 by Frank Zappa's The Mothers of Invention, accompanied by a "grotesque parody of the art of ballet dancing" performed by the band members. Though not as a direct result of this piece, Zappa was later banned from performing at this venue.

The third movement of this piece is often used for hold music while calling a customer support line.

References

Further reading

External links

  (Alte Mozart-Ausgabe version)
 

Piano Sonata 13
Compositions in B-flat major
Linz
1783 compositions